The Rinehart Building, located in the Eliot neighborhood in north Portland, Oregon, is listed on the National Register of Historic Places. The two-story brick building was constructed in 1910 and is one of the last remaining structures from the historic Albina neighborhood.

See also
National Register of Historic Places listings in North Portland, Oregon

References

1910 establishments in Oregon
Buildings and structures completed in 1910
Eliot, Portland, Oregon
National Register of Historic Places in Portland, Oregon
North Portland, Oregon
Portland Historic Landmarks